András Harangvölgyi (27 December 1920 – 17 September 2010) was a Hungarian cross-country skier. He competed in the men's 18 kilometre event at the 1948 Winter Olympics.

References

External links
 

1920 births
2010 deaths
Hungarian male cross-country skiers
Olympic cross-country skiers of Hungary
Cross-country skiers at the 1948 Winter Olympics
Skiers from Budapest
20th-century Hungarian people